Macrophage receptor with collagenous structure (MARCO) is a protein that in humans is encoded by the MARCO gene. MARCO is a class A scavenger receptor that is found on particular subsets of macrophages. Scavenger receptors are pattern recognition receptors (PRRs) found most commonly on immune cells. Their defining feature is that they bind to polyanions and modified forms of a type of cholesterol called low-density lipoprotein (LDL). MARCO is able to bind and phagocytose these ligands and pathogen-associated molecular patterns (PAMPs), leading to the clearance of pathogens and cell signaling events that lead to inflammation. As part of the innate immune system, MARCO clears, or scavenges, pathogens, which leads to inflammatory responses. The scavenger receptor cysteine-rich (SRCR) domain at the end of the extracellular side of MARCO binds ligands to activate the subsequent immune responses. MARCO expression on macrophages has been associated with tumor development and also with Alzheimer's disease, via decreased responses of cells when ligands bind to MARCO.

Structure 
MARCO is a transmembrane protein that has 5 domains (see figure). The domain within the cell is called the cytoplasmic domain, as well as a transmembrane domain. The extracellular regions of MARCO include a spacer domain, a collagenous domain, and the SRCR domain. The SRCR domain is required for MARCO binding to ligands, via 2 highly conserved arginine residues, termed the RxR motif. 

Other members of the class A scavenger receptors tend to have alpha helical coiled coil domains, but MARCO does not. The C-terminal SRCR domain of MARCO affects the ability of the receptor to bind and take up ligand, activate inflammatory signaling, and adhere to surfaces.

Cell expression 
MARCO is expressed on a subset of tissue-resident macrophages in normal tissues, as well as circulating monocytes, dendritic cells, and B cells. MARCO is typically present on the macrophages in the marginal zone of the spleen and the medullary lymph nodes, but it is also found in the liver. Dendritic cells increase expression of MARCO when exposed to certain pathogens, resulting in alterations to the cytoskeleton of dendritic cells and increased phagocytosis.

MARCO is highly expressed by macrophages and monocytes in the tumor microenvironment (TME), including tumor-associated macrophages (TAMs) and monocytic myeloid-derived suppressor cells (mMDSCs).  Expression of MARCO correlated (FDR < 0.01 and R > 0.2126212) with expression of genes associated with immunosuppressive TAMs, such as CD68, CD163, MSR1, IL4R, CHIA, TGFB1, IL10, and IL37, whereas no correlation was observed with expression of inducible nitric oxide synthase (NOS2), which is expressed by macrophages with an anti-tumor phenotype.

Functions

Phagocytosis 
The primary function of scavenger receptors is to regulate phagocytoseis of pathogens, but they also participate in cell–cell recognition and initiation of inflammatory responses. MARCO, being a PRR, is able to bind to a wide variety of bacteria, making it an important receptor for activating an immune response against bacteria. Soluble LPS and entire bacteria can each bind bind to MARCO, as well as acetylated LDL (AcLDL), oxidized LDL (OxLDL), B cells in the marginal zone of the spleen, and apoptotic cells. MARCO is therefore able to recognize and phagocytose pathogens and apoptotic cells, and operates independently of opsonization.

Regulation of Inflammation 
MARCO does not directly cause an inflammatory response, but it can interact with PAMPs to promote inflammation. One way MARCO does this is by tethering a pathogen to other receptors on the cell, including PRRs such as TLR2, which then lead to the activation of the transcription factor NF-κB, which regulates expression of genes that encode cytokines. Through phagocytosis, MARCO also brings pathogens into the cell, which are processed by intracellular compartments that contain other signaling receptors such as TLR3, NOD2, and NALP3. However, lung cancer cells polarize macrophages to express MARCO and acquire an immune-suppressive phenotype, through the release of IL37. MARCO-expressing TAMs blocked activation of cytotoxic T cells and NK cells, inhibiting their proliferation, cytokine production, and tumor-cell killing capacity. Furthermore, MARCO+ macrophages increased proliferation of T-regulatory (Treg) cells and production of IL10, and diminished activity of CD8+ T cells. Blocking MARCO or knocking out IL37 in lung cancer cell lines repolarized TAMs, resulting in recovered cytolytic activity and anti-tumor effects of natural killer (NK) cells and T cells, as well as reduced Treg-cell activities.

Association with diseases

Alzheimer's disease 
The activity of MARCO on microglia, the macrophages of the brain, is believed to be altered in development of Alzheimer's disease. One primary characteristic of Alzheimer's disease is the presence of numerous senile plaques in the brain that contain amyloid beta peptides (Aβ). Initially, the microglia clear the Aβ, which binds to receptors such as MARCO. During development of Alzheimer's disease, however, the ability of microglia to clear Aβ is decreased, resulting in Aβ accumulation, which is neurotoxic. MARCO also interacts with formyl peptide receptor 2 (FPR2) to form a complex that causes the microglia to release inflammatory cytokines, which can also cause damage to neurons.

Cancer 
Antibodies against MARCO have been shown to slow growth and metastasis in syngeneic mouse tumor models, by reprogramming immunosuppressive (M2)-like TAMs into inflammatory (M1)-like macrophages. This switch involves changes to the metabolic program of the macrophages and activation of NK cells. In addition, targeting MARCO on human macrophages repolarizes TAMs and restores the cytotoxic, anti-tumor capacities of NK and T cells. These findings indicate that strategies that target MARCO-expressing TAMs to remodel the immune-suppressive tumor microenvironment might be developed for cancer therapy.

In non-small-cell lung cancer (NSCLC) tissues, researchers found an association between expression of MARCO mRNA and genes that regulate immune response pathways, including immunosuppressive TAMs, T-cell infiltration, and immune checkpoint molecules. Higher infiltration of tumor tissues by macrophages was seen in tumors expressing PD-L1; macrophages within tumor cell nests co-expressed MARCO and PD-L1. MARCO is therefore a target of immune therapeutic strategies to inhibit TAMs in NSCLC, possibly in combination with immune checkpoint inhibitors.

In patients with renal cell carcinoma or colorectal cancer, those with tumors that expressed low levels of MARCO had longer survival times than patients whose tumors expressed high levels of MARCO. Additionally, high MARCO levels are observed in patients with melanoma that is refractory to checkpoint inhibitor therapy, and patients with solid tumors refractory to chemotherapy.

References

Further reading 

 
 
 
 
 
 
 
 

Scavenger receptors